Lebanon High School is a public high school located in the town of Lebanon, Virginia which sits inside of Russell County, Virginia. They are a part of the Russell County Public Schools system and have been accredited by the Virginia Department of Education for the 2022–2023 school year. Joseph Long is the current principal. The school offers several Dual Enrollment courses and Career/Technical courses in addition to other academic courses. Students also have the option to take online classes through Virtual Virginia and A. Linwood Holton Governor's School.

Athletics 
Lebanon High School is currently a member of the Virginia High School League and participates in the Hogoheegee District as well as the Region 1D conference. They offer 17 different VHSL sports. The Pioneers have won several VHSL team state championships, with the boys' varsity cross-country team being the most recent, as well as having several individual state champions.  The school mascot is the Pioneer with red and white being the school's team colors.

*Separate Middle School/8th Grade Team, JV Team, and Varsity Team

**Separate JV Team and Varsity Team

References

External links 
 

Public high schools in Virginia
Schools in Russell County, Virginia